Asparagus falcatus  (Sicklethorn, Large Forest Asparagus, Imblekazana or Doringtou) is a large, thorny, climbing plant of the Asparagus genus, that is indigenous to South Africa and Mozambique. It is often grown as a security hedge in southern Africa.

Appearance
This local Asparagus species sends up long shoots (sometimes up to 7 meters high) from its base of roots and massive tubers. These shoots are initially soft and curl around branches or fences. However, they soon harden, and the downward-pointing thorns help to hook the tendril onto its support - as well as providing defence. The leaves are dark-green, thin and curved.
It produces fragrant white blossoms that are followed by bright red berries, each containing a shiny black seed. The fruits attract a wide variety of birds.

Distribution
In South Africa, this creeper is indigenous to the forests of the Eastern Cape and Kwazulu Natal. It also occurs in neighbouring Mozambique.

Asparagus falcatus in cultivation
This rapidly growing climber can be grown in very shady parts of a garden, although it also tolerates some sun. It also prefers moist spots, though once established it can also tolerate some drought.
It serves as a very good safety hedge when planted along a fence that it can grow up through.

It can easily be propagated by seed, although it can also be grown from cuttings/trucheons.

References

Further reading
 

falcatus
Flora of Southern Africa
Creepers of South Africa
Plants described in 1753
Taxa named by Carl Linnaeus
Garden plants of Southern Africa
Vines